Frailty is a 1921 British silent drama film directed by F. Martin Thornton and starring Madge Stuart, Rowland Myles and Sydney Lewis Ransome.

Cast
 Madge Stuart as Diana  
 Rowland Myles as Charles Ley  
 Sydney Lewis Ransome as Beverly Dacre  
 Paulette del Baye as Felice Ley  
 H. Agar Lyons as Harman  
 J. Edwards Barker as Partner  
 Mrs. Gerald as Marie Ley

References

Bibliography
 Goble, Alan. The Complete Index to Literary Sources in Film. Walter de Gruyter, 1999.

External links

1921 films
1921 drama films
British silent feature films
British drama films
1920s English-language films
Films directed by Floyd Martin Thornton
Films based on British novels
Stoll Pictures films
Films set in England
British black-and-white films
1920s British films
Silent drama films